In enzymology, a [tyrosine 3-monooxygenase] kinase is an enzyme that catalyzes the chemical reaction

ATP + [tyrosine-3-monooxygenase]  ADP + phospho-[tyrosine-3-monooxygenase]

Thus, the two substrates of this enzyme are ATP and tyrosine 3-monooxygenase, whereas its two products are ADP and phospho-(tyrosine-3-monooxygenase).

This enzyme belongs to the family of transferases, specifically those transferring a phosphate group to the sidechain oxygen atom of serine or threonine residues in proteins (protein-serine/threonine kinases).  The systematic name of this enzyme class is ATP:[tyrosine-3-monoxygenase] phosphotransferase. Other names in common use include pheochromocytoma tyrosine hydroxylase-associated kinase, STK4, and tyrosine 3-monooxygenase kinase (phosphorylating).  This enzyme participates in MAPK signaling pathway and non-small cell lung cancer.

References

 
 

EC 2.7.11
Enzymes of unknown structure